Cătălin Răcănel (born 23 September 1976) is a Romanian former professional footballer and manager.

Career
BornBucharest, Romania, Răcănel grew up in Germany and played for the youth teams of SG Erbach and FC Homburg. His first senior club station was Regionalliga side Borussia Neunkirchen. In 1998, Răcănel left for SV Elversberg in the same league. He played in 29 matches for the club and scored two goals. After only one year in Elversberg, he left for SV Eintracht Trier 05 who also played in Regionalliga West/Südwest. At the start of the 2001–02 season, Răcănel signed for newly promoted Bundesliga side FC St. Pauli. However, following an injury, he played only seven Bundesliga matches. In his second year at St. Pauli, he played another seven matches in the 2. Bundesliga. At the end of the season he returned to Eintracht Trier, playing in 65 matches over the next two seasons. After Trier's relegation from 2. Bundesliga, Răcănel moved to LR Ahlen where he also was a regular starter, but left the club after they were relegated from 2nd Bundesliga as well. Răcănel signed for fourth-tier side Sachsen Leipzig in the NOFV-Oberliga. In 40 matches for Leipzig Răcănel scored five goals. In June 2008, Răcănel signed for Regionalliga Nord side 1. FC Magdeburg.

References

External links
 

1976 births
Living people
Romanian footballers
Romanian football managers
Romanian expatriate football managers
SV Elversberg players
SV Eintracht Trier 05 players
FC St. Pauli players
Rot Weiss Ahlen players
FC Sachsen Leipzig players
1. FC Magdeburg players
Romanian expatriate footballers
Romanian expatriate sportspeople in Germany
Bundesliga players
2. Bundesliga players
Borussia Neunkirchen players
Borussia Neunkirchen managers
Association football midfielders